Escadrille Spa.100 (originally Escadrille N.100) was a French fighter squadron active during the last 11 months of World War I. Flying combat as a component of larger fighter formations, Escadrille Spa.100 was credited with destroying 11 German airplanes and 12 observation balloons between 16 January and 11 November 1918.

History

Escadrille Spa.100 was based on a draft of men from Escadrille N.89. Formed on 16 January 1918, it was originally called Escadrille N.100 because it was outfitted with Nieuport 24, Nieuport 24bis, and Nieuport 27 aircraft. The new squadron was posted to VII Armee for duty. In early February, the escadrille was one of four incorporated into a new fighter grouping, Groupe de Combat 17. In early March, the squadron refitted with new SPAD S.7 and SPAD S.13 fighters. On 8 March, it was transferred to VI Armee; a week later, it was renamed Escadrille Spa.100. By the 11 November 1918 ceasefire, Escadrille Spa.100 was credited with the destruction of 11 German airplanes and 12 observation balloons.

Commanding officers

 Lieutenant Charles Boudox d'Hautefeuille: 16 January 1918 - missing in action 20 April 1918
 Lieutenant de Vaubicourt: 20 April 1918 - war's end

Notable member

 Sous lieutenant Marcel Haegelen

Aircraft

 Nieuport 24: 16 January 1918 - early March 1918
 Nieuport 24bis: 16 January 1918 - early March 1918
 Nieuport 27: 16 January 1918 - early March 1918
 SPAD S.7: Early March 1918 - war's end.
 SPAD S.13: Early March 1918 - war's end.

End notes

References

 Franks, Norman; Bailey, Frank (1993). Over the Front: The Complete Record of the Fighter Aces and Units of the United States and French Air Services, 1914–1918 London, UK: Grub Street Publishing. .
 1914-1918 Prisoners of the First World War, International Committee of the Red Cross Historical Archives (on line). 

Fighter squadrons of the French Air and Space Force
Military units and formations established in 1918
Military units and formations disestablished in 1918
Military units and formations of France in World War I
Military aviation units and formations in World War I